Al-Khader is a Palestinian town in the Bethlehem Governorate of the State of Palestine, in the south-central West Bank. According to the Palestinian Central Bureau of Statistics, the town had a population of 11,856 in 2017. The area around al-Khader is marked by vineyards, and olive and fig trees.

Solomon's Pools, the Monastery of St. George, and Al-Hamadiyya Mosque are al-Khader's main landmarks.

Name and St George tradition
Al-Khader is named after Saint George, who in Arab culture is sometimes associated with the Muslim saint al-Khadr, "the green one". According to local tradition, Saint George was imprisoned in the town of al-Khader where the current Monastery of St. George stands. The chains holding him were relics that were said to hold healing power.

History

Iron Age
In 1953, a hoard of at least twenty-six weapon-heads, either javelin- or arrowheads, were discovered in al-Khader, five of which are bearing inscriptions dating from c. 1100 BCE. The inscriptions are made in a transitional script, actually offering to the epigraphists the "missing link" between the pictographs of the Proto-Canaanite or Old Canaanite script, and the linear alphabetic Early Linear Phoenician script. The owner of the javelins or arrows apparently "signed" them, the translation being "dart/arrow of 'Abd Labi't [son of] Bin-'Anat", both names known from the period (see for instance the warrior Shamgar Ben Anat from the biblical Song of Deborah).

Crusader period
During the Crusader era, the village, called Casale S. Georgii, was granted by Geoffrey de Tor to the church in Bethlehem, and included in its possessions in 1227 and 1266.

Mamluk period
Around 1421/1422 CE the Church of St. George was mentioned by Western traveler John Poloner as situated on a hill near Bethlehem.

Ottoman period
During late Ottoman rule (1516-1917), al-Khader was part of the political-administrative sheikdom and nahiyah ("subdistrict") of Bani Hasan, which was ruled by the Absiyeh family of al-Walaja. In 1838 its inhabitants were classified as Muslims by the English scholars Edward Robinson and Eli Smith, part of the Beni Hasan District, west of Jerusalem. In 1863 Victor Guérin found the village "reduced to two hundred inhabitants, almost all Muslims." He further noted remains of constructions, with rather large stones, which he thought were dated from an era prior to the Arab conquest.

Albert Socin notes that an official Ottoman village list from about 1870 documented el-chadr with a population of 122 in a total of 43 houses, though that population count only included men. It was further noted that the small Greek monastery served as a mental asylum.

In 1882, the PEF's Survey of Western Palestine described al-Khader as a moderate-sized village with a "Greek church and convent." It was surrounded by vineyards and olive groves and "rock-cut tombs" were situated to the north of the village. It had a mixed population of Muslims and Greek Orthodox Christians, according to the Survey of Western Palestine. 

In 1896 the population of El-chadr was estimated to be about 210 people.

British Mandate
In the British Mandate 1922 census of Palestine, al-Khader had a population of 697; 694 Muslims and 3 Christians. By the 1931 census of Palestine, the population was 914, mostly Muslim with three Christian inhabitants. 

In the 1945 statistics the town had 1,130 Muslim inhabitants and a total land area of 20,100 dunams. It was a part of the Jerusalem District. Of the land, 5,700 dunams were irrigated or used for plantations, 5,889 dunams were for cereals, while 96 dunams were built-up (urban) land.

The Orthodox Christian Church owns several hundreds of dunams made up of vineyards, olive groves and field crops. The lands were entrusted to them since the Rashidun era during the caliphate of Umar who presided over the conquest of Palestine in the 630s. Most of the land is leased to Muslim farmers.

Jordanian period
In the wake of the 1948 Arab–Israeli War, and after the 1949 Armistice Agreements, al-Khader came under Jordanian rule. It was annexed by Jordan in 1950.

In 1961, the population of Khadr was 1,798.

Post 1967
Since the Six-Day War in 1967, al-Khader has been under Israeli occupation. The population in the 1967 census conducted by the Israeli authorities was 2,051. 

After the 1995 accords, 9% of al-Khader's land was classified as Area A land, 5.5% as Area B, and the remaining 85.5% as Area C. 

Israel has confiscated land from al-Khader in order to construct two Israeli settlements: 
27 dunams for Neve Daniyyel,
2 dunams for Efrat.

In 1997, the PCBS recorded a population of 6,802 of which 3,606 were males and 3,196 were females. Unlike many Palestinian towns in the area, refugees and their descendants do not have a substantial population in al-Khader. In 1997, 5.2% of the town's inhabitants were recorded as refugees. In the 2007 PCBS census, al-Khader had a population of 9,774.

Since the construction of the Israeli West Bank barrier around al-Khader, several thousand dunams of farmland have been separated from the village, with the inhabitants unable to access them without a permit. In 2006, 50 villagers protested the barrier by filling bags with grapes and selling them along Route 60. Israeli soldiers and police attempted to quell protesters resulting in the injuries and detainment of two residents.

In April 2015 villagers blocked work by settlers to create a bypass road for access to an illegal outpost, which, if completed, would alienate a further 400 dunams of village land.

Geography and land

The older part of al-Khader is situated on a saddle-shaped hill facing a steep ridge to the south and open areas to the north, in the central highlands of the West Bank. Nearby localities include the Dheisheh Refugee Camp adjacent to the east, the village of Artas further to the east, Beit Jala to the northeast, al-Walaja and the Israeli settlement of Har Gilo to the north, Battir and Husan to the northwest, Nahalin and the Israeli settlements of Beitar Illit to the west, Neve Daniel to the southeast, and Elazar to the south.

Culture

Historical and religious sites
The Orthodox Christian Monastery of St. George and 
Solomon's Pools are located in al-Khader and are main tourist attractions.  Al-Khader's main and oldest mosque is the al-Hamadiyya Mosque. According to the International Middle East Media Center, in 2007, it was burned down by Israeli settlers. The mosque is about 700 years old and was restored by the Tourism Ministry of the Palestinian National Authority.

Cultural festivals

Al-Khader is also well known in the area for its peaches, grapes and apples. It hosts its annual Grape Festival every September. The festival was initiated by the al-Khader municipality to promote the town's primary agricultural product, grapes. Other exhibitions held at the festival include one on embroidery and knitting, a local heritage exhibition of mills, grinders, and harvest tools, and an exhibition of home-made grape products such as dibs (molasses made from grapes). Al-Khader Stadium which holds a capacity of 6,000 is located in the town.

Government
Al-Khader is governed by a municipal council of thirteen members including the mayor. In the 2005 municipal elections, the Hamas-affiliated Reform list won the most seats (five), while the Fatah-affiliated Falasteen al-Ghad list won four seats. Two independent lists — Al-Aqsa and Abnaa al-Balad — each won two seats.

References

Bibliography

External links
Welcome To al-Khadr
Al-Khader, Welcome to Palestine
Survey of Western Palestine, Map 17: IAA, Wikimedia commons
El-Khader - Bethlehem This Week in Palestine. 2008-12-05.
Al Khader Town (Fact Sheet), Applied Research Institute–Jerusalem (ARIJ)
Al Khader Town Profile, ARIJ
Al Khader aerial photo, ARIJ
The priorities and needs for development in Al Khader town based on the community and local authorities’ assessment, ARIJ

 
Towns in the West Bank
Municipalities of the State of Palestine
Populated places in the Bethlehem Governorate